Urocortin is a protein that in humans is encoded by the UCN gene. Urocortin belongs to the corticotropin-releasing factor (CRF) family of proteins which includes CRF, urotensin I, sauvagine, urocortin II and urocortin III. Urocortin is involved in the mammalian stress response, and regulates aspects of appetite and stress response.

Structure, localization, and interactions 
Urocortin is a peptide composed of 40 amino acids. Urocortin is composed of a single alpha helix structure. The human UCN gene contains two exons, and the entirety of the coding region is contained within the second exon. Urocortin is expressed widely in the central and peripheral nervous systems, with a pattern similar to that of CRF. Areas of similarity between urocortin and CRF expression include the supraoptic nucleus and the hippocampus. Urocortin is also expressed in areas distinct from CRF expression; these areas notably include the median eminence, the Edinger-Westphal nucleus, and the sphenoid nucleus. Additionally, Urocortin is expressed in peripheral tissues such as the heart.

Urocortin is known to interact both with the CRF type 1 and CRF type 2 receptors. Furthermore, Urocortin is thought to be the primary ligand for the CRF type 2 receptor, as it has higher binding affinity for the CRF type 2 receptor than CRF. Additionally, urocortin interacts with CRF Binding Protein in the mammalian brain.

Stress response and social behavior 
Urocortin is closely related to CRF, which mediates the mammalian stress response. Urocortin is consequently implicated in a number of stress responses, primarily relating to appetite and food intake. Administration of urocortin to the central nervous system of mice and rats has been shown to decrease appetite. Additionally, central urocortin treatment increases anxiety-linked behaviors and increases motor activity in mice and rats. These general anxiety-linked behaviors are likely induced through the CRF type 1 receptor, and the appetite behaviors are likely induced through the CRF type 2 receptor. The reduction in appetite from urocortin treatment could be a result of suppression of gastric emptying and/or hypoglycemia, which have been shown to result from urocortin treatment. Urocortin expression is stimulated in response to osmotic stress; water deprivation in rats has been shown to induce urocortin expression in the supraoptic nucleus.

Montane Voles and Meadow Voles are closely related species of voles which are regularly studied as a model for social and mating behavior. The distribution of urocortin-expressing neurons differs in meadow voles compared to montane voles, suggesting urocortin may also play a role in modulating social behavior in some species.

Cardiovascular effects 
Urocortin has been shown to induce increases in heart rate and coronary blood flow when applied peripherally. These effects are likely mediated through the CRF type 2 receptor, as this receptor is found in the cardiac atria and ventricles. Urocortin also functions to protect cardiovascular tissue from ischemic injury. Urocortin's cardiovascular effects separate it from other members of the CRF family, and likely represent its primary biological function.

In non-mammals 
Urocortin is not present in all non-mammals; the closet analogue in teleost fish is urotensin I. However, in amphibian species such as Xenopus laevis, urocortin is expressed in tissues such as brain, pituitary, kidney, heart, and skin. Urocortin in Xenopus has been shown to increase cAMP accumulation and inhibit appetite

References

Further reading

External links 
 

Corticotropin-releasing hormone receptor agonists
Peptide hormones